The Sarah Siddons Award, established in 1952, is presented annually to an actor for an outstanding performance in a Chicago theatrical production. The winner receives a statuette of the Welsh stage actress Sarah Siddons.

It is awarded by the Sarah Siddons Society, an American non-profit organization founded in 1952 by prominent Chicago theatre patrons with the goal of promoting excellence in the theatre.

History 
The Society and its award were inspired by a fictional award depicted in the opening scene of the Joseph L. Mankiewicz film All About Eve, winner of the 1950 Academy Award for Best Picture. The film opens with the image of an award trophy, described by character Addison DeWitt (George Sanders) as the "highest honour our theater knows: the Sarah Siddons Award for Distinguished Achievement." The award was invented by Mankiewicz for the script.

In 1952, a small group of eminent Chicago theater-goers, including actress Edith Luckett Davis, mother of future First Lady Nancy Davis Reagan, organized the Society and began presenting an award physically modeled and named after the one in the film.

Joseph L. Mankiewicz also received the award. His response was, reportedly, "I invented it to put down all this fatuous prize-giving, and now there's some outfit in Chicago actually promoting a Sarah Siddons Award every year, and people like Helen Hayes go out there and make tearful acceptance speeches." 

During the Sarah Siddons Society Anniversary Gala in 1973, an honorary Sarah Siddons award was presented to Bette Davis, even though she didn't appear in a Chicago play that year. Another All About Eve cast member, Celeste Holm, had previously won the award. Lauren Bacall, who played Davis' role in the Broadway musical version, Applause, has also won.

Scholarships 
In addition to the award, the Society also funds a number of scholarships for theatre and other performance university students in the Chicago area.  Beginning in 2013, the Society has partnered with the Chicago Humanities Festival to expose young students from disadvantaged backgrounds to live performances.

Award winners 
Actress/Actor of the Year:

1953 – Helen Hayes (also 1969)
1954 – Beatrice Lillie
1955 – Deborah Kerr
1956 – Nancy Kelly (also 1964)
1957 – Shirley Booth
1958 – Anne Rogers 
1959 – Ruth Roman
1960 – Geraldine Page
1961 – Gertrude Berg
1962 – Florence Henderson
1963 – Julia Meade
1964 – Nancy Kelly (also 1956)
1965 – Myrna Loy
1966 – Carol Channing
1967 – Eve Arden
1968 – Celeste Holm
1969 – Helen Hayes (also 1953)
1970 – Barbara Rush
1971 – Irene Dailey
1972 – Lauren Bacall (also 1984)
1973 – Bette Davis 
1973 – Sada Thompson (also 1988)
1974 – Colleen Dewhurst
1975 – Angela Lansbury (also 1981)
1976 – Julie Harris
1977 – Lynn Redgrave (also 1995)
1978 – Cloris Leachman
1979 – Jessica Tandy
1980 – Claudette Colbert
1981 – Angela Lansbury (also 1975)
1982 – Dorothy Loudon
1983 – Ann Miller
1984 – Lauren Bacall (also 1972)
1985 – Rita Moreno
1986 – Lucie Arnaz
1987 – Liza Minnelli
1988 – Sada Thompson (also 1973)
1989 – Lily Tomlin
1990 – Ellen Burstyn
1991 – Loretta Swit
1992 – Hollis Resnik
1993 – Stefanie Powers
1994 – Bernadette Peters
1995 – Lynn Redgrave (also 1977)
1996 – Julie Andrews
1997 – Faye Dunaway
1999 – Brian Dennehy
2000 – Heather Headley
2002 – Chita Rivera
2004 – Elaine Stritch
2006 – John Mahoney
2008 – Kathleen Turner
2009 – William Petersen
2010 – Patti LuPone
2011 – John O'Hurley
2012 – Barbara Cook
2013 – Audra McDonald
2014 – Bebe Neuwirth
2015 – Jessie Mueller
2016 – Sutton Foster, Brian d'Arcy James
2017 – Kate Baldwin, Kate Shindle
2018 - Betty Buckley
2019 - Tracy Letts
2020 - Brian Stokes Mitchell
2021 - André De Shields

References

External links
Sarah Siddons Award in All About Eve
Sarah Siddons Society

American theater awards
Organizations based in Chicago
Theatre in Chicago